Ayodele Peters (born 21 May 1957) is a Nigerian boxer. He competed in the men's light welterweight event at the 1980 Summer Olympics.

References

External links
 

1957 births
Living people
Nigerian male boxers
Olympic boxers of Nigeria
Boxers at the 1980 Summer Olympics
Sportspeople from Lagos
Light-welterweight boxers